Greatest Hits Volume One: The Singles is a greatest hits album by American rock band Goo Goo Dolls. It contains every hit single from Dizzy up the Girl to Let Love In, a newly recorded track, "Before It's Too Late", from the Transformers motion picture and a newly recorded version of their first hit single, "Name". The album was released on November 13, 2007.

The album marks a milestone for the band. It is their first greatest hits album, and at the time of its release, the band's two remaining founders John Rzeznik and Robby Takac had been together for 21 years. The follow-up compilation, Vol.2, was released on August 19, 2008, consisting of rarities, B-sides, covers and a DVD of music videos and live performances.

Volume One debuted at number 33 on the U.S. Billboard 200 chart, selling about 33,000 copies in its first week.

Track listing

Charts

Weekly charts

Year-end charts

Certifications

References

2007 greatest hits albums
Goo Goo Dolls compilation albums
Warner Records compilation albums